Builder's risk insurance (Contractor's All Risk insurance – CAR insurance) is a special type of property insurance which indemnifies against damage to buildings while they are under construction.  Builder's risk insurance is "coverage that protects a person's or organization's insurable interest in materials, fixtures and/or equipment being used in the construction or renovation of a building or structure should those items sustain physical loss or damage from a covered cause."

Necessity 
Buildings are subject to many different risks while under construction.  They may catch fire, be damaged by high winds, or fall victim to other force majeure.  A principle of common law is that any new construction or other improvement to land becomes property of the owner of the land – the title holder – once there has been an "improvement" to the owner's site. Builder's risk insurance indemnifies against some of these particular losses.

Coverage 
Builder's risk covers perils such as fire, wind, theft and vandalism and many more.  It typically does not cover perils such as earthquake, flood or hurricane damage unless the policy has been specifically endorsed to do so.  However, earthquake riders can be very economical, depending on where your project is located and should be considered. These policies also do not cover accidents and injuries at the workplace. and is intended to terminate when the work has been completed and the property is ready for use or occupancy. If you are going to properly setup your policy, coverage should be effective prior to when the materials are delivered to the job site.  Coverage ends upon the earlier of closing of the sale, occupancy or the policy expiration date.  After builder risk coverage expires, due to sale or occupancy, the new owner should take out permanent property insurance on the building such as a home owner's policy or a commercial property policy.

Insurance costs generally run between one and four percent of the construction cost, depending upon the type of insurance purchased and exclusions from coverage.

Purchasers 
Coverage can be purchased by the property owner or general contractor. Builder's risk coverage may be necessary to show proof of insurance to comply with local city, county, and state building codes and is often required as a condition to many contracts.  Many architects believe that it is the property owner who should have the builder's risk policy, because they have already paid for the improvements to their land, and if the general contractor receives the funds directly from a claim, theoretically, he/she could abscond with that benefit. It is far safer for the property owner to obtain the builder's risk policy, because they already own the building, even while it is under construction. If something happens to the under-construction project, then they should be the beneficiary and control how it is spent. The general contractor ends up receiving the funds in the end, to rebuild damage, but this method gives the control of the insurance benefit to the owner.

Alternatives 
If the project involves renovations or additions to an existing building, the owner's existing property insurance may cover the work under construction, eliminating the need for builder's risk insurance.  (Policies vary.)  However, in the case of new buildings under construction on vacant sites, the owner may not have an existing policy that provides coverage.

References 

Construction documents
Types of insurance